The HTC Tornado is a smartphone model designed by High Tech Computer Corporation and powered by the Windows Mobile 5 operating system. It has QVGA display resolution.

The Tornado is rebranded as at least 9 different models: the Dopod 586W, Qtek 8300, T-Mobile USA SDA (AKA SDA II), Cingular 2125, i-mate SP5 and Orange SPV C600. These individual companies customize the operating system and sell it as a consumer package.

Features
 240 x 320 pixels TFT display (65k colors)
 1.3-megapixel camera
 64 MB SDRAM, 64 MB Flash ROM, miniSD card slot
 TI OMAP 850, 200 MHz processor
 EDGE, Wi-Fi, Bluetooth, Infrared

References

Latest Mobile Phone in Hindi

External links
 HTC
 Latest Mobile Phone Information in Hindi
Tornado
Mobile phones introduced in 2005
Windows Mobile Standard devices